Pratapgad is a mountain fort located in Satara district, in the Western Indian state of Maharashtra.The fort is situated 24 kilometres from the Mahabaleshwar hill station. The fort is now a popular tourist destination.

The fort's historical significance is due to the Battle of Pratapgad, which took place here on 10 November 1659, between Shivaji and Bijapur Sultanate general Afzal Khan. Chatrapati Shivaji's killing of Afzal Khan was followed by decisive Maratha victory over the Bijapur army.

History

The Maratha ruler Shivaji assigned  Moropant Trimbak Pingle, his prime minister, to undertake the construction of this fort in order to defend the banks of the Nira and the Koyna rivers, and to defend the Par pass. It was completed in 1656.

The Battle of Pratapgad between Shivaji and Afzal Khan, a general of Adil Shahi dynasty, was fought below the ramparts of this fort on 10 November 1659. This was the first major test of the fledgling kingdom's army, and set the stage of the establishment of the Maratha empire.

Pratapgad continued to be involved in regional politics. Sakharam Bapu Bokil, a well-known minister of Pune, was confined by his rival Nana Phadnis in Pratapgad in 1778. He was later moved from fort to fort until he died at Raigad. In 1796, Nana Phadnis, while escaping from the intrigues of Daulatrao Shinde and his minister Baloba, assembled a strong garrison in Pratapgad before heading to Mahad. In 1818, as part of the Third Anglo-Maratha War, Pratapgad surrendered by private negotiation. This was a great loss to the Maratha forces, as Pratapgad was an important stronghold, had a large garrison, and could suppress much of the country around Wai.

Geography

Pratapgad fort is located at 15 km (10 miles) from Poladpur and 23 km (15 miles) west of Mahabaleshwar, a popular hill station of Maharashtra. The fort stands 1080 metres (3543') above sea level and is built on a spur which overlooks the road between the villages of Par and Kinesvar.

The fort has a Tulja Bhawani temple from Shivaji's time. It have murti of goddess Bhawani, which have eight hands (Marathi : Ashtbhuja). Weapons of soldiers are on display near this temple.

Tourism

Pratapgad is usually visited as a day-trip from the hill station of Mahabaleshwar, a popular tourist destination located 25 kilometres away. Maharashtra State Road Transport Corporation provides regular bus service. There are small shops, restaurants and a handicrafts store. Many schools also arrange educational  trips to the fort. The fort is also on many trekking routes of the area.

An bronze equestrian statue of Shivaji is present at the fort. It was unveiled by Jawaharlal Nehru, then Prime Minister of India on 30 November 1957. The same year a road was constructed by the Public Works Department from Kumbhrosi village up to fort. A guest house and a small park was built inside the fort in 1960.

See also

List of forts in Maharashtra

References

Forts in Satara district
1656 establishments in India
Mahabaleshwar

External links